Beneath the neck of the radius, on the medial side, is an eminence, the radial tuberosity; its surface is divided into:
 a posterior, rough portion, for the insertion of the tendon of the biceps brachii.
 an anterior, smooth portion, on which a bursa is interposed between the tendon and the bone.
Ligaments that support the elbow joint also attach to the radial tuberosity.

References

External links
 
 

Additional images

Radius (bone)